Seyssel is a commune in the Haute-Savoie department in the Auvergne-Rhône-Alpes region in south-eastern France.

The part of the town across the Rhône is also named Seyssel but located on the western bank of the Rhône in the Ain department. It is a rare case in France of two homonymous communes adjacent to each other, similar to the situation of the village of Saint-Santin, divided between the communes of Saint-Santin (Aveyron) and Saint-Santin-de-Maurs (Cantal).

Geography
The Fier forms most of the commune's southern border, then flows into the Rhône, which forms the commune's western border.

See also
Communes of the Haute-Savoie department
List of medieval bridges in France

References

Communes of Haute-Savoie